The Coburg shooting was an attempted school killing at Realschule II in Coburg, Bavaria, Germany during the morning of 2 July 2003.

History 
Florian K. shot a school psychologist in the thigh when she attempted to take the gun from him. According to police reports, he then committed suicide by shooting himself in the head. Before he began shooting, Florian showed the gun to other students and passed around ammunition, which some students kept as souvenirs.

Perpetrator

Florian K. (name undisclosed by news sources), the gunman and student, fired his Walther PPK pistol at his teacher, who was unarmed. The gun was owned by Florian's father, who was a member of a local gun club. Media speculation further implicated Florian in Satanist cult activities and was a fan of Dark Funeral.

References

2003 crimes in Germany
2003 in Bavaria
Crime in Bavaria
Coburg
School killings in Germany
Suicides by firearm in Germany
July 2003 events in Europe
School shootings in Germany
Crimes involving Satanism or the occult